Mount Hayden is a mountain located in the Catskill Mountains of New York northeast of Windham. Mount Nebo is located north-northwest, and Ginseng Mountain is located southeast of Mount Hayden.

References

Hayden
Hayden